Tillandsia deppeana is a species of flowering plant in the genus Tillandsia. This species is endemic to Mexico.

Cultivars
 Tillandsia 'Mayan Torch'
 Tillandsia 'Sentry'
 Tillandsia 'Wildfire'
 × Vrieslandsia 'Inca Chief'
 × Vrieslandsia 'Mayan Chief'
 × Vrieslandsia 'Nedra'
 × Vrieslandsia 'Stargazer'

References

BSI Cultivar Registry Retrieved 11 October 2009

deppeana
Endemic flora of Mexico